Massachusetts House of Representatives' 6th Essex district in the United States is one of 160 legislative districts included in the lower house of the Massachusetts General Court. It covers the city of Beverly in Essex County. Democrat Jerry Parisella of Beverly has represented the district since 2011.

The current district geographic boundary overlaps with that of the Massachusetts Senate's 2nd Essex district.

Representatives
 Mark F. Edmonds, circa 1858 
 Edwin B. George, circa 1859 
 Albert S. Manning, circa 1888 
 Michael F. Sullivan, circa 1888 
 Michael H. Jordan, circa 1920 
 John Cornelius Bresnahan, circa 1951 
 Joseph T. Conley, circa 1951 
 John E. Murphy Jr., circa 1975 
 F. John Monahan
 Frances Alexander
 James R. Henry
 Michael P. Cahill
 Mary E. Grant, 2003-2011 
 Jerald A. Parisella, 2011-current

Former locales
The district previously covered:
 Newbury, circa 1872 
 Newburyport, circa 1872

See also
 List of Massachusetts House of Representatives elections
 Other Essex County districts of the Massachusetts House of Representatives: 1st, 2nd, 3rd, 4th, 5th, 7th, 8th, 9th, 10th, 11th, 12th, 13th, 14th, 15th, 16th, 17th, 18th
 Essex County districts of the Massachusett Senate: 1st, 2nd, 3rd; 1st Essex and Middlesex; 2nd Essex and Middlesex
 List of Massachusetts General Courts
 List of former districts of the Massachusetts House of Representatives

Images

References

External links
 Ballotpedia
  (State House district information based on U.S. Census Bureau's American Community Survey).

House
Government of Essex County, Massachusetts